Otto Becker may refer to:

 Otto Becker (equestrian) (born 1958), German Olympic show jumper
 Otto Becker (fencer) (1887–1970), Danish Olympic fencer
 Otto Heinrich Enoch Becker (1828–1890), German ophthalmologist